Cherokee Township, Kansas may refer to:

 Cherokee Township, Cherokee County, Kansas
 Cherokee Township, Montgomery County, Kansas, Montgomery County, Kansas

See also 
 List of Kansas townships
 Cherokee Township (disambiguation)

Kansas township disambiguation pages